William Francis "Liam" O'Brien (born 5 September 1964) is an Irish former footballer who played for Bohemians, Shamrock Rovers, Manchester United, Newcastle United, Tranmere Rovers and Cork City.

Club career 
O'Brien began his career with the schoolboy club Stella Maris. He began his senior career under Billy Young at Bohemians where he was also a youth international representing his country at the 1983 UEFA European Under-18 Football Championship where Ireland were knocked out despite not losing a game.

In April 1983 he played for the League of Ireland XI U21s against their Italian League counterparts who included Roberto Mancini and Gianluca Vialli in their team .

After only five League appearances, he signed for Shamrock Rovers in September 1983.

After having won his third League of Ireland title with Shamrock Rovers in 1986, and making six appearances in European competition and 118 total appearances, O'Brien became Ron Atkinson's last signing as manager of Manchester United. He joined the Reds for an initial fee of £50,000.

Alex Ferguson took over from Atkinson as manager in November 1986, and O'Brien made his debut in the 1986–87 season, making nine appearances, including an appearance in January 1987 where he was shown a red card just 85 seconds into a game against Southampton. The sending-off is the quickest dismissal in club history. The majority of his appearances in the 1987–88 season were as a substitute, and, frustrated by lack of first-team opportunities, he joined Newcastle United in a £275,000 move in November 1988, after 36 appearances (31 in the League) & two goals for Manchester United.
 
His career at St James' Park brought mixed fortunes. O'Brien suffered relegation from the top flight in the 1988–89 season. However, he played a major role as Newcastle won the First Division title in 1993, making 33 appearances and scoring six goals.

O'Brien found himself surplus to requirements as Newcastle rejoined the top flight and subsequently made a £350,000 move to Tranmere Rovers after a successful loan period. After Tranmere, he signed for Cork City, where he played in the UEFA Cup before returning to Bohemians in 2000 as player-coach. He enjoyed some great European nights during this season as Bohs knocked out Aberdeen and beat 1.FC Kaiserslautern. He also played a part as Bohs won the League and Cup Double before retiring as a player.

International career
O'Brien played for the Republic of Ireland national under-19 football team that qualified for the 1983 UEFA European Under-18 Football Championship where despite remaining unbeaten in a group that included eventual winners France they were eliminated. He was also a Republic of Ireland international, winning his first cap while still at Shamrock Rovers. In all he won 16 caps as well as an U23 cap and was part of the UEFA Euro 1988 squad.

Coaching career
After retiring as a player, O'Brien had spells as assistant manager at Bohemians and Shamrock Rovers. He was appointed first team coach of Hibernian in November 2011 by Pat Fenlon. O'Brien left Hibernian after the end of the 2012–13 season.
O'Briens last coaching role was at Sligo Rovers who he joined in 2015.

Honours

Club
Shamrock Rovers
League of Ireland (3): 1983–84, 1984–85, 1985–86
FAI Cup (2): 1985, 1986
Leinster Senior Cup: 1984–85
LFA President's Cup (2): 1984–85, 1986–87
Dublin City Cup: 1983–84

Newcastle United
Football League First Division: 1992–93

Individual
PFAI Young Player of the Year: 1985–86
SWAI Personality of the Year: 1985–86

References

1964 births
Living people
Association footballers from County Dublin
Republic of Ireland association footballers
Republic of Ireland international footballers
Republic of Ireland youth international footballers
Republic of Ireland under-23 international footballers
Association football midfielders
Bohemian F.C. players
Shamrock Rovers F.C. players
Manchester United F.C. players
Newcastle United F.C. players
Tranmere Rovers F.C. players
League of Ireland players
Cork City F.C. players
UEFA Euro 1988 players
Premier League players
Hibernian F.C. non-playing staff
English Football League players
League of Ireland XI players
Stella Maris F.C. players